Death Note is a 2017 American supernatural crime thriller film loosely adapted from the Japanese manga of the same name created by Tsugumi Ohba and Takeshi Obata. The film is directed by Adam Wingard and written by Charles and Vlas Parlapanides, and Jeremy Slater. The film stars Nat Wolff, LaKeith Stanfield, Margaret Qualley, Shea Whigham, Paul Nakauchi, Jason Liles, and Willem Dafoe, and follows the story of an American high school student named Light Turner (portrayed by Wolff) who finds a mysterious supernatural notebook known as the Death Note, which can kill anyone whose name is written in its pages, using it to murder criminals under the alias of Kira, while a secretive detective only known as L (portrayed by Stanfield) seeks to find him.

Death Note was screened at FrightFest in London and was subsequently released on Netflix on August 25, 2017. It received highly mixed reviews from critics. A sequel is in development, with Greg Russo attached to write the screenplay.

Plot 
In Seattle, Washington, high schooler Light Turner stumbles across the Death Note, a mysterious leather-bound notebook with instructions that state that by writing a person's name down within it, that person will die in the manner prescribed. Light meets Ryuk, a death god and the notebook's owner. Ryuk convinces Light to use the notebook; Light writes down a bully's name and shortly thereafter witnesses him being killed in a freak accident. That night, Light tries it again, using the name of his mother's killer, Anthony Skomal, and learns the next morning from his father James, a police detective, that Skomal died as Light had written. At school, Light shows Mia the book and demonstrates its power by killing a known criminal felon during a televised hostage situation. The two decide to work together to rid the world of criminals and terrorists, with Light deciding on using the name Kira (derived from the Japanese trans-literation for "Killer", so as to direct investigative attention away from their continent).

Kira's actions draw the attention of enigmatic international detective L, who deduces Kira is a Seattle-based student with close ties to the police and indirectly concludes Kira can only kill by knowing the name and face of their victim. Working with James and the police, L has several FBI agents track Light and other suspects. Light refuses to kill them when Mia suggests it, but soon the agents commit mass suicide, which Light believes Ryuk made them do. James threatens Kira over public broadcast but when he fails to be killed, L confronts Light about being Kira and prepares the police to thoroughly search Light's home. Light decides to use the Death Note to force L's personal assistant Watari to travel to Montauk, New York, and find L's adoption record there; Light plans to burn the notebook page with Watari's name once he knows L's name to stop Watari's death, then kill L. Mia helps to sneak the notebook out before the search.

Light and Mia go to the school dance, using the event to ditch L and the police. Light recovers the notebook just as Watari contacts him with L's name from the orphanage he was raised in, but Light cannot find the page in the notebook where Watari's name is written. Watari is then killed by security for trespassing before he can reveal L's name. Light discovers Mia took Watari's page, caused the agents' suicide, and has written Light's name in the book, set to kill him at midnight, but she offers to burn his page if he turns the notebook over to her. Light flees, telling Mia to meet him at the Seattle Great Wheel. Enraged at Watari's death, L leaves on a personal manhunt against Light, while James orders L to be detained. L corners Light, but a Kira Supporter, hearing that Light is Kira, knocks L out, letting Light escape. Mia meets Light at the wheel and they ride to the top. There, Mia steals the notebook, but realizes too late this was Light's plan: Light has written her death in the notebook contingent on her taking it. Ryuk then makes the wheel collapse, sending Mia falling to her death, while Light and the notebook fall into the nearby waters. L witnesses the page with Light's name land in a burning barrel.

Before meeting Mia, Light had used the book to coerce a criminally-charged doctor to rescue him and put him into a medically-induced coma, while having another criminal recover the Death Note and continue Kira's killings before returning the book to his bedside, killing both after their role is complete. Meanwhile, L is ordered off the case for his apparent misconduct, but in defiance, he raids Mia's home, finds the notebook page with the agents' names and deduces its capabilities. In a hysterical fit, he considers writing a name (implied to be Light's). When Light wakes from his coma at a hospital with James, who has come to conclude Light is Kira, by his side, he tries to convince James that his actions were "the lesser of two evils", prompting Ryuk to laugh and comment that "humans are so interesting."

Cast 
 Nat Wolff as Light Turner / Kira: A bright yet isolated high-school student who discovers the titular Death Note and uses it to kill criminals by writing their names and causes of death, in a bid to change the world into a utopia without crime, and thus becoming the world-famous serial killer known as Kira, while being both praised and feared by law enforcement agencies and the worldwide media and public. In stark contrast to his manga counterpart, this version of Light lacks much of the original's ruthless, sadistic and sociopathic tendencies and is depicted in a more sympathetic and humanized light. However, at the end of the film, he does show a somewhat darker, more intellectual side to his character that is not unlike the Light from the anime and manga.
 LaKeith Stanfield as L: A nameless, highly-intelligent and esteemed—but also socially eccentric and quirky—international consulting detective with a past shrouded in mystery and who is determined to capture "Kira" and end his reign of terror.
 Margaret Qualley as Mia Sutton: Light's classmate and girlfriend, who assists him in his worldwide massacre of criminals as the god-like vigilante: Kira, eventually seeking to kill those who seek to stop them and becoming dangerously obsessed with the book's power. In an interview with io9, Adam Wingard noted that rather than being a direct adaptation of the manga character Misa Amane, Sutton is partially based on the sociopathic qualities of Light Yagami.
 Shea Whigham as Detective James Turner:Light's widowed father and a veteran Seattle police detective, who assists L in finding the mysterious Kira, unaware that he is his own son. Unlike the original manga version, James has lost his wife in an acquitted hit-and-run crime and has a more strained relationship with his son. 
 Paul Nakauchi as Watari: L's assistant and foster-father.
Jason Liles and Willem Dafoe as Ryuk: A demonic Shinigami (god of death) and the original owner of the Death Note, who begins communicating with Light when he receives the book and inquisitively observes his activities as Kira with amusement. Liles played the character in costume, while Dafoe provided voice work and performance capture for the facial elements.

Producer Masi Oka makes a cameo as Detective Sasaki: a Tokyo police detective investigating one of Light's murders. Christopher Britton—who played Soichiro Yagami, James Turner's original counterpart from the manga, in the English dub of the Death Note anime—makes a cameo appearance as Aaron Peltz, a serial child molester and one of Light's victims.

Production

Development 
In 2007, the Malaysian newspaper The Star stated that more than ten film companies in the United States had expressed interest in the Death Note franchise. The American production company Vertigo Entertainment was originally set to develop the remake, with Charley and Vlas Parlapanides as screenwriters and Roy Lee, Doug Davison, Dan Lin, and Brian Witten as producers. On April 30, 2009, Variety reported that Warner Bros. Pictures, the distributors for the original Japanese live-action films, had acquired the rights for an American remake, with the original screenwriters and producers still attached. In 2009, Zac Efron responded to rumors that he would be playing the film's lead role by stating that the project was "not on the front burner".  On January 13, 2011, it was announced that Shane Black had been hired to direct the film, with the script being written by Anthony Bagarozzi and Charles Mondry. Warner's studios planned to change the background story of Light Yagami into one of vengeance instead of justice and to remove Shinigami from the story. Black opposed this change, and it had not been green-lit. Black confirmed in a 2013 interview with Bleeding Cool that he was still working on the film. In July 2014, it was rumored that Gus Van Sant would replace Black as the film's new director, with Dan Lin, Doug Davison, Roy Lee and Brian Witten producing through Vertigo Entertainment, Witten Pictures and Lin Pictures.

On April 27, 2015, The Hollywood Reporter revealed that Adam Wingard would direct the film, that Lin, Lee, Jason Hoffs, and Masi Oka would produce, and that Niija Kuykendall and Nik Mavinkurve would oversee the studio. Producers stated the film would receive an R rating. In April 2016, TheWrap reported that because Warner Bros. had decided to make fewer films, the studio put the film into turnaround but allowed Wingard to take the project elsewhere. Within 48 hours, Wingard was reportedly approached by nearly every major film studio.  On April 6, 2016, it was confirmed that Netflix had bought the film from Warner Bros. with a budget of $40–50 million and a recent draft of the script being written by Jeremy Slater. Production officially began in British Columbia on June 30, 2016, where Vancouver doubled as Seattle, overseen by DN (Canada) Productions, Inc. Atticus Ross and Leopold Ross composed the score for the film.

Casting 

On September 29, 2015, Nat Wolff was cast in the lead role. On November 12, 2015, Margaret Qualley joined the film as the female lead.  In June 2016, LaKeith Stanfield joined the cast. On June 30, 2016, it was announced that Paul Nakauchi and Shea Whigham had joined the cast. On August 2, 2016, Willem Dafoe was announced to voice the Shinigami Ryuk. In the wake of Dafoe's casting, Brian Drummond, who voiced Ryuk in the English dub of the anime, voiced his approval citing the casting of Ryuk. Oka, one of the film's producers, announced that he also has a role in the film.

Early casting announcements, similar to other Hollywood productions based on Japanese manga such as Dragonball Evolution and Ghost in the Shell, resulted in accusations of whitewashing. In response, producers Roy Lee and Dan Lin stated: "Our vision for Death Note has always been to...introduce the world to this dark and mysterious masterpiece. The talent and diversity represented in our cast, writing, and producing teams reflect our belief in staying true to the story's concept of moral relevance—a universal theme that knows no racial boundaries."

Wingard addressed the concerns over the film, explaining that the film is an American take on the Death Note story, stating, "It's one of those things where the harder I tried to stay 100 percent true to the source material, the more it just kind of fell apart... You're in a different country, you're in a different kind of environment, and you're trying to also summarize a sprawling series into a two-hour-long film. For me, it became about; what do these themes mean to modern day America, and how does that affect how we tell the story." Wingard also stated that he mainly attempted to make a unique and different take on the original manga, while also trying to keep the core themes and elements of the original manga intact, such as the cat and mouse dynamic between the main protagonists: Light and L, the themes of morality and justice, the difference between good and evil, certain characteristics and elements of the original manga characters (such as Light's father still being a police officer, L's mannerisms and personality traits, along with his background and past originating from a secluded orphanage, Light being depicted as an intellectually-gifted and introverted high school student, Ryuk's personality traits and affinity for apples).

Release 
The film was screened at FrightFest in London, before being released on Netflix on August 25, 2017. On July 20, 2017, the film was screened early for audiences at San Diego Comic-Con International.

Critical reception 
Death Note received mostly mixed to negative reviews. On review aggregation website Rotten Tomatoes, the film has an approval rating of 37% based on 76 reviews, and an average rating of 4.73/10. The site's critical consensus reads, "Death Note benefits from director Adam Wingard's distinctive eye and a talented cast, but they aren't enough to overcome a fatally overcrowded canvas." Metacritic gave the film a score of 43 out of 100, based on 14 critics, indicating "mixed or average reviews".

Jeanette Catsoulis for The New York Times wrote that the film "feels rushed and constricted" compared to the volume of the source material, but praised how Wingard's direction focused on "mood over mayhem" to make the adaptation his own. Peter Debruge for Variety said that he felt that Wingard took the film adaptation towards a Donnie Darko-styled work that would capture the interest of more Western audiences compared to the original work, but made the work capture the feel of a theatrical film rather than a work confined to its original medium. Debruge also wrote that despite the philosophical concepts of murdering via the Death Note, "the movie never quite reckons with just how twisted a concept it's peddling, and that's easily the scariest thing about it". Brian Tallerico for Rogerebert.com gave the film one of four stars, stating that the changes that Wingard had made from the original work did not serve any artistic or thematic purpose, nor captured the cat-and-mouse game between Light and L that was core to the original work, and because the producers "refused to make Light the antihero he needed to be", the addition of Mia as a love interest "[left] the project hollow at its center"  — but mainly praised the performances of Stanfield and Dafoe.

Tsugumi Ohba and Takeshi Obata, the original creators of Death Note, have praised the film, with the former stating, "In a good way, it both followed and diverged from the original work so the film can be enjoyed, of course by not only the fans, but also by a much larger and wider audience."

Director Adam Wingard deleted his Twitter account after receiving backlash from the negative reviews.

Use of train accident images 
A few months after release, it was discovered that the images of the train accident in the movie were real footage of a 2010 train collision in Buizingen, Belgium, in which 19 people died. Both the rail operator and survivors have criticized this as disrespectful to the victims.

Sequel 
In an interview with Heat Vision, Wingard stated that Netflix had wanted to make at least two films, and would if the success of the first film merited it, saying, "There are definitely lots of places to go, and we know generally where we would take it. Hopefully, people will watch it and Netflix will order a sequel. They definitely are ready to. They just need people to watch it."

On August 22, 2018, The Hollywood Reporter reported that a sequel was in development, with Greg Russo writing the script. On April 20, 2021, Russo revealed that the sequel would be more faithful to the manga than the first film. On September 21, 2021, Oka stated that the sequel promises fan criticism of the first film will be taken into account.

Notes

References

External links 
 
 

2017 films
2017 horror films
2017 crime thriller films
2017 horror thriller films
2017 crime films
2010s American films
2010s English-language films
2010s supernatural thriller films
2010s vigilante films
American dark fantasy films
American horror thriller films
American supernatural horror films
American supernatural thriller films
American vigilante films
Death Note
Films directed by Adam Wingard
Films produced by Dan Lin
Films produced by Roy Lee
Films scored by Atticus Ross
Films set in Seattle
Live-action films based on manga
Films using motion capture
English-language Netflix original films
Films set in Washington (state)
Films with screenplays by Jeremy Slater
American neo-noir films
American remakes of Japanese films
Vertigo Entertainment films